Ehteshamuddin (born 4 September 1950) is a former Pakistani cricketer who played in five Test matches from 1979 to 1982.

A right-arm medium paced bowler who relied on accuracy rather than pace, Ehteshamuddin toured India with the Pakistan side that played six Tests in 1979–80, and was picked for three of them, the first, fourth and sixth. India won the series 2–0, but Ehtesham did well, taking 14 wickets at an average of less than 20 runs per wicket. In the fourth Test at Kanpur, he took five first innings wickets for 47 runs, his best Test bowling performance, sharing all 10 wickets with Sikander Bakht. He later played one match in the home series against Australia in the same season.

Ehteshamuddin's last Test was as a last minute replacement at Headingley on the 1982 England tour.  He was playing club cricket for Daisy Hill in the Bolton Association league at the time and the Pakistan team was hard-hit by injuries. Ehteshamuddin looked unfit, and though he took the first England wicket to fall – Graeme Fowler – he bowled only 14 overs before suffering a hamstring injury and was not able to bowl again in the match. The game and the series was lost. He did not play Test cricket again. His batting was modest.

In recent years, Ehteshamuddin has been a Pakistan national cricket team selector.

References

External links

1950 births
Living people
Pakistan Test cricketers
Pakistani cricketers
Punjab University cricketers
Lahore Greens cricketers
Lahore A cricketers
Lahore cricketers
Pakistan International Airlines cricketers
National Bank of Pakistan cricketers
National Bank of Pakistan B cricketers
Punjab (Pakistan) cricketers
United Bank Limited cricketers
Cricketers from Lahore